Joseph Musaphia (born 1935) is a New Zealand writer and actor who was born in London.

Biography 
Joseph Musaphia was born in 1935 in London and he has Portuguese ancestry. He moved with his family to Melbourne, Australia and lived there from 1938 until 1946 when they moved to Christchurch, New Zealand. He attended Christchurch Boys' High School and left age 15. He spent three years as an apprentice motor mechanic until he switched to art and cartooning, working in commercial art for ten years. Over a period of three years, while we was in his early twenties his cartoons were published weekly in The Listener magazine.

Musaphia started writing and acting for stage, screen and radio after his first play was produced by the New Zealand Theatre Company in 1961. He was inspired to write after attending the Unity Theatre production of Look Back In Anger by John Osborne.

In 1971 Musaphia and Roger Hall won a Logie Award for best television comedy, Australia A – Z. 

The play Mother and Fathers first presented in 1975 at the Fortune Theatre in Dunedin also had presentations in at the Court Theatre and Downstage in Wellington. Musaphia acted in the early productions. It was so popular in Wellington it transferred to the much larger theatre the Opera House for three nights. In 1979 he received the first Victoria University of Wellington Writer's Fellowship. 

Circa Theatre chose the Musaphia play Mates to celebrate their tenth year in 1986 and it was directed and starred Ray Henwood. Musaphia wrote his first novel in 1997, has been a columnist for The Evening Post in Wellington, and continues to write stage and radio plays.

Stage Plays
 1971 – The Guerilla
 1973 – Victims - premiered at Downstage 1973
 1974 – Obstacles - premiered at Downstage 1974
 1975 - Mother and Fathers - premiered at the Fortune Theatre, revised in 2005
 1980 - Hunting - premiered at Circa Theatre
 1983 - A Fair Go For Charlie Wellman 
 1983 - The Plague
 1986 - Mates - premiered at Circa Theatre
 1988 - The New Zealander - premiered at the Fortune Theatre
 2018 – Problems - premiered at Circa Theatre

Radio Plays 

 1976 – Flotsam and Jetsum (NZBC)
 1976 – The Guerilla (NZBC)
 1976 – Never Let it Be Said (NZBC)
 1978 – Just Desserts (NZBC)
 1979 – Mind Jogging (NZBC)
 1985 – Mothers and Fathers (RNZ)

Film and television

 2019 – Funny As: The Story of New Zealand Comedy, Subject – Television
 1986 – Between the Lines, Writer – Television
 1983 – Comedy Playhouse, Writer – Television
 1975 – 1976, Today at One, Writer, Actor – Television
 1974 – 1975, Buck House, Writer – Television
 1973, Richard John Seddon – Premier, Actor – Television
 1971, Noel Ferrier's Australia A-Z, Writer – Television
 1969 – 1970, In View of the Circumstances, Actor, Writer – Television
 1967 – 1968, Joe's World – Presenter, Writer – Television
 1966 – Don’t Let It Go – film

References

1935 births
Living people
New Zealand male dramatists and playwrights
20th-century New Zealand dramatists and playwrights
20th-century New Zealand male writers
New Zealand people of Portuguese descent
Writers from London
English emigrants to New Zealand
People educated at Christchurch Boys' High School